Baldernock (Gaelic: Baile D' Earnaig) meaning 'settlement of St Earnaig' (Iain Mac an Táilleir, Sabhall Mór Ostaig) is a small parish in East Dunbartonshire (formerly in Stirlingshire), Scotland,  to the north of Glasgow's city centre.

Geography
It is centred on Baldernock Parish Church, which is under the jurisdiction of the Presbytery of Dumbarton. However, it also encompasses the hamlets of Balmore, Bardowie and Barnellan. The parish also has a farm known as Barraston Farm, which has a nearby garden centre. Other landmarks include Bardowie Loch, Bardowie Castle, and Blairskaith.

History
In 1200, Baldernock was called Bathernock or Buthirnok. By the early 18th century, it was known as Badernock. There had been a church on the present-day site for at least a century and a half. Certainly, the oldest gravestone is from 1644, and the oldest gravestone that can be deciphered is from 1665. However, by the late 18th century, the church was in severe disrepair. Thus, in 1795, a new 406-person church was built, incorporating some of the stonework of the previous church. Later, a vestry projection was added to the north side. In 1905, a railway station, called Bardowie Station, was opened, and a housing development of 500 houses was planned. However, fewer than 10 were actually built, and in 1951, the station was closed.

See also
List of places in East Dunbartonshire
List of places in Scotland

Bibliography
 Old Glasgow and Its Suburbs in Their Celtic Garb: Also, Parish of Baldernock, Kirkintilloch to Stirling, Robroyston by Neil Thomson (Aird & Coghill, 1907). 
 The Story of Baldernock by Elizabeth Robertson and Willie Ure (East Dunbartonshire District Libraries, 1991).
 Baldernock – Profile of a Parish Baldernock Amenity Society, May 1974.

References

External links

Scotland's Churches Trust - Baldernock Parish Church
GENUKI - Baldernock
FamilySearch - Baldernock, Stirlingshire, Scotland
EDLC - Baldernock

Villages in East Dunbartonshire